The trigonometry of a tetrahedron explains the relationships between the lengths and various types of angles of a general tetrahedron.

Trigonometric quantities

Classical trigonometric quantities 
The following are trigonometric quantities generally associated to a general tetrahedron:
 The 6 edge lengths - associated to the six edges of the tetrahedron.
 The 12 face angles - there are three of them for each of the four faces of the tetrahedron.
 The 6 dihedral angles - associated to the six edges of the tetrahedron, since any two faces of the tetrahedron are connected by an edge.
 The 4 solid angles - associated to each point of the tetrahedron.
Let  be a general tetrahedron, where  are arbitrary points in three-dimensional space.

 
 

Define the following quantities:
  = the length of the edge 
  = the face angle at the point  on the face 
  = the dihedral angle between two faces adjacent to the edge 
  = the solid angle at the point

Area and volume 
Let  be the area of the face . Such area may be calculated by Heron's formula (if all three edge lengths are known):

 

or by the following formula (if an angle and two corresponding edges are known):

 

Let  be the altitude from the point  to the face . The volume  of the tetrahedron  is given by the following formula: It satisfies the following relation:

 
where  are the quadrances (length squared) of the edges.

Basic statements of trigonometry

Affine triangle 

The usual laws for planar trigonometry of a triangle hold for this triangle.

Projective triangle 
Consider the projective (spherical) triangle at the point ; the vertices of this projective triangle are the three lines that join  with the other three vertices of the tetrahedron.

The usual laws for spherical trigonometry hold for this projective triangle.

Laws of trigonometry for the tetrahedron

Alternating sines theorem
Take the tetrahedron , and consider the point  as an apex. The Alternating sines theorem is given by the following identity:One may view the two sides of this identity as corresponding to clockwise and counterclockwise orientations of the surface.

The space of all shapes of tetrahedra 

Putting any of the four vertices in the role of O yields four such identities, but at most three of them are independent; if the "clockwise" sides of three of the four identities are multiplied and the product is inferred to be equal to the product of the "counterclockwise" sides of the same three identities, and then common factors are cancelled from both sides, the result is the fourth identity.

Three angles are the angles of some triangle if and only if their sum is 180° (π radians). What condition on 12 angles is necessary and sufficient for them to be the 12 angles of some tetrahedron? Clearly the sum of the angles of any side of the tetrahedron must be 180°. Since there are four such triangles, there are four such constraints on sums of angles, and the number of degrees of freedom is thereby reduced from 12 to 8. The four relations given by the sine law further reduce the number of degrees of freedom, from 8 down to not 4 but 5, since the fourth constraint is not independent of the first three. Thus the space of all shapes of tetrahedra is 5-dimensional.

Law of sines for the tetrahedron 
See: Law of sines

Law of cosines for the tetrahedron 
The law of cosines for the tetrahedron relates the areas of each face of the tetrahedron and the dihedral angles about a point. It is given by the following identity:

Relationship between dihedral angles of tetrahedron 
Take the general tetrahedron  and project the faces  onto the plane with the face . Let .

Skew distances between edges of tetrahedron 
Take the general tetrahedron  and let  be the point on the edge  and  be the point on the edge  such that the line segment  is perpendicular to both  & . Let  be the length of the line segment .

To find :

Let  be the intersection of these two lines.

As a consequence, the quantity  is equal to the altitude from the point  to the face  of the tetrahedron ; this is shown by translation of the line segment .

By the volume formula, the tetrahedron  satisfies the following relation: where  is the area of the triangle . Thus, the previous relation becomes: To obtain , consider two spherical triangles: 
 Take the spherical triangle of the tetrahedron  at the point ; it will have sides  and opposite angles . By the spherical law of cosines: 
 Take the spherical triangle of the tetrahedron  at the point . By the spherical law of cosines: 
Combining the two equations gives the following result:

Note that the denominator is a re-formulation of the Bretschneider-von Staudt formula, which evaluates the area of a general convex quadrilateral.

References

Spherical trigonometry